"Labyrinth" is the third single from Icarus, the debut EP from Kero Kero Bonito singer Sarah Midori Perry's solo project Cryalot. "Labyrinth" was released 31 August 2022, cowritten by Perry and producer Jennifer Walton, and came with a music video directed by Joshua Homer.

Style 
Perry described the song's narrative as being "about hope and our ability to dream even when we are trapped in our own reality", "draw[ing] parallels between the myth of Icarus and the confines of our own emotional landscapes." Pitchforks Sam Goldner calls the song "a tender power ballad whose glitching, yeule-y intro explodes into a cybernetic wall of rich, blasting synth chords" which showcases Perry's "mastery of tension and release". Slant Magazines Eric Mason says the song "evoke[s] M83's Hurry Up, We're Dreaming with [its] wistful meditations and sonic grandeur." Spectrum Cultures Aymeric Dubois wrote that on the song, Perry "uses a melancholy tone to mesmerize through catharsis, while her ethereal voice melts perfectly on the atmospheric keys of the instrumental."

Music video 
The Joshua Homer-directed video is set in an abandoned building in Bethnal Green. BroadwayWorlds Michael Major describes as "dream-like" and says it "conjures a shadowy, woozy setting for Sarah and Jennifer Walton ... to play out the song's hopeful narrative."

Track listings 

 Digital download and streaming
 "Labyrinth" (Edit) – 3:32

Spotify single
 "Labyrinth" (Edit) – 3:32
 "Labyrinth" – 4:11
 "Touch the Sun" – 4:37
 "Hell Is Here"– 2:23

References 

2022 singles
2022 songs
Cryalot songs
AWAL singles